Biktima is a 2012 Filipino drama film starring Cesar Montano and Angel Aquino. The film is directed by R.D. Alba and produced under Alba Productions and CM Films. It is released by Star Cinema on September 19, 2012.

Plot
Alice de la Cruz (Angel Aquino) is a TV field reporter at KVTV. But when she gets the dangerous assignment to cover kidnappings in the island of Kamandao, she takes the opportunity for this might be her big break. Her husband Mark (Cesar Montano) does not agree with her decision to take the assignment. He warns her of how risky it is to go to the island. Alice takes the chance anyway and that was the last time Mark has seen Alice.

Mark blames himself for not stopping Alice from going to the island. The movie unfolds as Mark discovers what has really happened to Alice in Kamandao.

Cast
 Cesar Montano as Mark de la Cruz
 Angel Aquino as Alice de la Cruz
 Mercedes Cabral
 Ricky Davao
 Sunshine Cruz
 Philip Anthony
 Rommel Montano
 Disi Alba
 JM Ibañez
 Ardy Batoy
 Scarlet
 Lloyd Samartino
 Iris Garsuta

References

External links

2012 films
2010s Tagalog-language films
2010s English-language films
2012 thriller drama films
Star Cinema films
2012 drama films
Philippine thriller drama films
2012 multilingual films
Philippine multilingual films